Throughout its long history, Mercedes-Benz has been involved in a range of successful motorsport activities, including sportscar racing, touring car racing, Grand Prix racing, and rallying. It is currently active in GT racing, and Formula One.

Early history

The two companies which were merged to form the Mercedes-Benz brand in 1926 had both already enjoyed success in the new sport of motor racing throughout their separate histories. A single Benz competed in the world's first motor race, the 1894 Paris–Rouen, where Émile Roger finished 14th in 10 hours 1 minute. The Mercedes Simplex of 1902, built by DMG, was Mercedes' first purpose-built race car—much lower than their usual designs—which were similar to horse carriages; that model dominated racing for years. In 1914, just before the beginning of the First World War, the DMG Mercedes 35 hp won the French Grand Prix, finishing 1–2–3.

Karl Benz's company, Benz & Cie. built the "bird beaked", Blitzen Benz that set land speed records several times, reaching  in 1911. That record gained that model the reputation of being faster than any other automobile—as well as any train or plane. They constructed many aerodynamically designed race cars.

Grand Prix motor racing

The Silver Arrows (1923–1931, 1934–1939)

Benz was involved in Grand Prix motor racing from 1923, when the Benz Tropfenwagen (described as having a teardrop shape) was introduced to motorsport at the European Grand Prix at Monza. These, the brainchild of Benz chief engineer Hans Nibel (1880–1934), were inspired by the Rumpler Tropfenwagen and were intended to increase public acceptance of mid-engined cars. They resembled the later Auto Unions (also built in part by Rumpler engineers), and used the virtually unchanged Rumpler chassis.

Despite a promising start, with a fourth and a fifth (and one retirement) in their debut, they did no better in three years of Grands Prix and hillclimbing, and the expected public acceptance did not materialize. Financial difficulties led to a merger with Daimler.

In the 1930s, the new joint company, Daimler-Benz, with their mighty Mercedes-Benz Silver Arrows, dominated Grand Prix racing in Europe together with its rival, Auto Union. In fact the colour of the cars, which was later to become legendary, was unintentional—they had initially been painted white as was traditional for German cars, but the paint was stripped away to reduce weight. The team was guided by the great Rennleiter (racing team manager) Alfred Neubauer (1891–1980) until the company ceased racing at the start of WWII.

Formula One

Original factory team (1954–1955)

In 1954 Mercedes-Benz returned to what was now known as Formula One racing  (a World championship having been established in 1950), using the technologically advanced Mercedes-Benz W196 which was run in both open-wheeled and streamlined forms. Juan Manuel Fangio (1911–1995), a previous champion (1951) transferred mid-season from Maserati to Mercedes-Benz for their debut at the French Grand Prix on 4 July 1954. The team had immediate success and recorded a 1–2 victory with Fangio and Karl Kling (1910–2003), as well as the fastest lap (Hans Herrmann). Fangio went on to win three more races in 1954, winning the Championship.

The success continued into the 1955 season, where the same car was used again. The team's drivers, Fangio and the young Stirling Moss (1929–2020), won 6 of the 9 rounds between them, and finished first and second in that year's championship.

Following the 1955 Le Mans disaster, Mercedes-Benz withdrew from all factory-sponsored motorsport.

Engine supplier

Mercedes made its return to Formula One in 1994 as an engine supplier to Sauber, with whom they had already enjoyed success in sportscar racing, after 1993 funding their engine partner Ilmor, Mercedes and Sauber announced that the teams' engines will be rebadged "Mercedes-Benz" for the 1994 season thus signaling Mercedes partial return to factory-sponsored motorsport the first time since 1955. In the one year that Sauber ran Mercedes badged engines they only managed to score twelve points.

McLaren (1995–2014, 2021–) 

 saw the normally aspirated Mercedes-Benz-Ilmor F1-V10 move to the Woking based McLaren team, replacing Peugeot who moved to supplying their engines to the Jordan team. In a season dominated by the Renault powered Benetton B195s and Williams FW17s, the McLaren-Mercedes partnership produced thirty points with 2 podium finishes from Mika Häkkinen.  produced similar results to '95 with the team finishing behind the trio of Williams, Benetton and Ferrari, but the team still scored three times as many podium positions in comparison to the previous year. Outside Formula One, Mercedes-Benz had increased its shareholding in the Ilmor company in 1996 and took full control nine years later. They have continued to design and build engines for McLaren.

In the opening race of the 1997 Formula One season, David Coulthard produced victory for McLaren and ushered in a new era of success for the British based squad. Coincidentally this was the first race in which McLaren had competed with a silver livery due to West replacing Marlboro, who moved to Ferrari, as title sponsor. The colour drew inevitable comparisons to the Silver Arrows of a previous era, and the nickname was applied to the McLarens. This was a significant result in F1 racing, McLaren's first victory for three seasons and the first win for Mercedes-Benz since Juan Manuel Fangio's success at the 1955 Italian Grand Prix. McLaren and Mercedes-Benz still, however, finished fourth in the Constructors' Championship behind the same three teams as the previous two seasons, but they had collected more than twice as many points in '97 as they had in '95.

Häkkinen went on to win the title for the second time in succession the following season, however, the team failed to retain their Constructors' title, losing it to Ferrari by four points. 

 and  saw McLaren and their drivers play second fiddle to the dominant partnership of Michael Schumacher and Ferrari, as the Italian-German partnership won nineteen of a possible thirty-four races. Häkkinen retired from Formula One before the  season, although he would later represent Mercedes in the Deutsche Tourenwagen Masters series. Fellow Finn Kimi Räikkönen replaced him. McLaren dropped down the order in terms of Constructors' Championship position, losing its second-place position to the BMW-Williams team, with the season still being dominated overall by Schumacher and Ferrari. In  McLaren's drivers finished second and third in the Drivers' Championship, only 1 point behind Champion Kimi Räikkönen. In  Lewis Hamilton won the Drivers' Championship by 1 point from Ferrari's Felipe Massa. Jenson Button won McLaren-Mercedes’ last win in 2012 at the 2012 Brazilian Grand Prix.

For the 2014 Season, McLaren-Mercedes would use the Mercedes PU106A Hybrid, a 1.6-litre V6 turbocharged engine. In their final season as McLaren-Mercedes the team finished 5th in the World Constructors' Championship standings with 181 points. At the end of the season, Mercedes-Benz officially ended its 20-year partnership with McLaren.

On September 28, 2019, Mercedes-Benz and McLaren agreed to a four-year deal for Mercedes-Benz to be an engine supplier for McLaren in the beginning of the year 2021. McLaren's first season back with Mercedes power saw them achieve a 1-2 result at the 2021 Italian Grand Prix with Daniel Ricciardo and Lando Norris finishing 1st and 2nd, respectively, and 3 further podiums (all from Norris) to finish 4th in the Constructors' Championship.

Williams (2014–present) 
In early 2013, it was announced that Mercedes-Benz would be the engine supplier to Williams for the 2014 season. The team finished the  season placing third in the World Constructors' Championship standings with 257 points, with both Felipe Massa and Valtteri Bottas scoring 4 podiums during the season. For the  season, Williams-Mercedes faced a disappointing season only finishing 10th in the World Constructors' Championship standings. On 13 September 2019, Williams and Mercedes-Benz agreed to extend their partnership until 2025.

Safety cars 

In 2003, the partnership between Mercedes and McLaren was extended into the production of a Mercedes-McLaren roadcar, the SLR. Mercedes also supplies the cars to the FIA for use as safety cars and other race official roles, such as the medical car, at Formula One races. Currently, in Formula One, Mercedes and Aston Martin both supply the Safety Car and alternate per race. At the moment the Mercedes safety car is a red design.

New factory team (2010–present)

On November 16, 2009, it was announced that Mercedes would buy Brawn. They purchased 75% which gave them the controlling stake in the 2009 championship-winning team Brawn GP. The team, renamed and branded Mercedes GP, debuted at the 2010 Bahrain Grand Prix, with an all-German driver line-up of Nico Rosberg and Michael Schumacher and was their full return to factory sponsored motorsport in F1. Mercedes's dominance would end in 2021, with Hamilton losing the title to Max Verstappen.

Sportscar racing

It was in 1952 that Mercedes-Benz returned to racing after the war, again with Alfred Neubauer as team manager. The gull-winged Mercedes-Benz W194, won several races in 1952 including the 24 Hours of Le Mans, the Carrera Panamericana, and did well in other important races such as the Mille Miglia.

Mercedes-Benz was also dominant in sports car racing during the 1950s. The Mercedes-Benz 300 SLR was derived from the W196 Formula One car for use in the 1955 World Sportscar Championship season. At Le Mans that year, a disaster occurred in which a Mercedes-Benz 300 SLR collided with another car, killing more than eighty spectators. The team went on to win the two remaining races of the season, and won the Manufacturer's championship, but it had already been planned at the beginning of that year that the company would retire its teams at the end of the 1955 season. In fact in the aftermath of the Le Mans disaster, it would be several decades until Mercedes-Benz returned to front line motorsport.

In the late 1960s and early 1970s, Mercedes returned to competition through the tuning company AMG (later to become a Mercedes-Benz subsidiary), which entered the big Mercedes-Benz 300SEL 6.3 V8 sedan in the Spa 24 Hours and the European Touring Car Championship.

In 1985 Mercedes-Benz returned to the World Sportscar Championship as an engine supplier for the privateer Sauber team. The first car produced by this relationship, the Sauber C8 was not particularly successful. However the successor, the C9 won several races, including 24 Hours of Le Mans in 1989.

After the Sauber team parted company with their sponsor Kouros at the end of 1987, Mercedes-Benz increased their involvement with Sauber for the 1988 season to become a factory entrant under the Sauber-Mercedes name. Still using the C9 the team won 5 races but came 2nd to the TWR Jaguar team in the championship. However, 1989 was to be a different story with Sauber-Mercedes winning all but one championship race to become world champions (including coming 1st and 2nd at the 24 Hours of Le Mans - all achieved with the C9. For the 1990 World Sportscar Championship season the C9 was replaced by the all-new C11, while the team was renamed Mercedes-Benz (though the outfit was still run by Sauber). The team dominated the season, again winning all but one race to become world champions. Mercedes-Benz eventually withdrew from sportscar racing after a dismal 1991 season with the C291.

Mercedes-Benz returned to sportscar racing in 1997, with the CLK GTR which was entered in the new FIA GT Championship world championship series. In its first year, the CLK GTR won the teams' and the drivers' championships. It would again dominate the FIA GT in 1998, and would go on to win its second championship in a row. The CLK GTR would be the last car to win the FIA GT Championship. The successor to this car, the CLR was a spectacular failure. It was entered in the 1999 Le Mans race, but a series of accidents involving the car flipping brought about the cancellation of the CLR project and Mercedes-Benz (as a factory team) has not participated in sports prototype racing since.

In 2001, Mercedes-Benz and AMG returned to tarmac rallying, with a specially modified version of the W208 CLK55 AMG. Mercedes-Benz and AMG created a one off works Tarmac Rally Car to compete with full factory support in the 2001 Targa Tasmania tarmac rally in Australia. Mick Doohan, 5 time motorcycle champion, was chosen as the works driver. 

In 2011, Mercedes-Benz announced that a GT3 version of the Mercedes-Benz SLS AMG would be made available for private racing teams. Beginning that year, the SLS AMG GT3 has taken numerous endurance racing wins at the 24 Hours of Dubai, 24 Hours of Nürburgring and 24 Hours of Spa and has won many other races in national and global GT3 championships. In 2015, the new Mercedes-AMG GT3 was launched to replace the SLS AMG GT3.

Touring cars

It was intended that Mercedes-Benz would enter rallying with the Mercedes-Benz W201 in the early 1980s. Yet, as all wheel drive and turbochargers were introduced by the competition (Audi Quattro) at that time, this was cancelled. Instead the W201 ended up being used in the DTM touring car series from 1988, with the car again being prepared by AMG, who became an official partner and continue to enter the new DTM. However, Mercedes-Benz will cease its factory involvement in DTM at the end of the 2018 season in order to join the Formula E series for Season 6 (2019–20).

In 2013, Mercedes-Benz entered the V8 Supercars Championship with the Erebus Motorsport team, fielding three Mercedes-Benz E63s V8s in 2013 and two in the 2014 and 2015 championships. For the 2016 season, Erebus ceased development of its E63 AMGs to instead field a pair of Holden VF Commodores, bringing an end to Mercedes-Benz' involvement in the Supercars Championship for the foreseeable future.

Formula E

On July 24, 2017, Mercedes announced that they would enter the FIA Formula E Championship for the 2019-20 season with a works effort, leaving the DTM series in favour of the new venture. The team will be known as the Mercedes EQ Formula E team and will make use of the same powertrain development facility as the Formula One team, Mercedes AMG High Performance Powertrains in Brixworth, UK. One of the teams that ran Mercedes cars in the DTM entered the 2018-19 season as HWA Racelab, which will become the full works team in 2019-20. They won both the 2020-21 and 2021-22 Formula E World Drivers' and Teams' Championships, with Stoffel Vandoorne and Nyck de Vries, before selling the team to McLaren.

Other sports

Speed records
It went on to become the 190E 2.3-16 touring model.

IndyCar

In 1994, Al Unser Jr. won the Indianapolis 500 with a Penske-Mercedes IndyCar. The engines were developed and built by Ilmor, but were badged as Mercedes-Benz. Ilmor which, realizing that a loophole in the rules for production-based engines would include any pushrod engine, built a very unusual purpose-built pushrod engine with a significant power advantage. This was done knowing that the "forgotten" loophole would be closed immediately after they took advantage of it, and so the engine would in fact be usable only for this single race.

Starting from 1995, Daimler AG entered the CART IndyCar World Series full-time via the Mercedes-Benz brand by rebranding the Ilmor engines. They achieved six wins in their first full season, also reaching second in the Drivers' Championship powering Al Unser Jr. After a dry spell in 1996, Mercedes-Benz came back in 1997 with nine wins and won the Manufacturers' Championship. However, a lack of competitive results in the following seasons and the CART/IRL split meant Mercedes gradually lost interest and the German manufacturer shut down its CART Champ Car operations at the end of the 2000 season as DaimlerChrysler re-allocate their resources for NASCAR Winston Cup Series from 2001 onwards via the Dodge brand (Mercedes-Benz and Dodge were sister brands at the time as well as R5P7 engines were also helped development by Mercedes-Benz). In total, Mercedes achieved 18 wins and one driver runner-up finish in the CART championship (Al Unser Jr. in 1995).

Formula Three

In the five years since Mercedes-Benz began its involvement in Formula Three, it has developed into the formula's most dominant engine supplier. Its engines, which are built and serviced by H.W.A GmbH, have so far contributed to a total of four drivers' and four teams' championship titles in the Formula Three Euroseries and British Formula Three Championship.

The H.W.A Mercedes-AMG M271 was based on a 1.8 litre 4-cylinder from the C-Klasse, bored out to the regulation 2.0 litre capacity. Formula Three engine regulations demand a naturally aspirated, 4-stroke, 4-cylinder, production-based specification, with a capacity of not more than 2,000 cc. The M271 made its competitive debut in the 2002 German Formula 3 Championship in two of Mücke Motorsport's three Dallara F302 chassis, driven by Markus Winkelhock and Marcel Lasse. Winkelhock achieved Mercedes' first F3 win at the Nürburgring in August 2002.

In 2003, Mercedes expanded its Formula Three program by supplying three teams in the inaugural year of the F3 Euroseries. Its engine powered the seven cars of Mücke Motorsport, Team Kolles, and ASM Formule 3. Speiss-Opel was dominant, thanks in part to Ryan Briscoe and Prema Powerteam, but Mercedes was winning by the eighth round. Its most notable win was provided by Christian Klien at Zandvoort in the non-championship Marlboro Masters.

Between 2004 and 2006, Mercedes-powered cars dominated the drivers' and teams' championships in the Euroseries, due in part to its close relationship with ASM Formule 3, which is one of France's most successful F3 teams. During that period, it brought drivers' titles for Jamie Green, Lewis Hamilton, and Paul di Resta. 2006 also saw Mercedes' first participation in the British F3 Championship, when it partnered with Räikkönen Robertson Racing, co-owned by Kimi Räikkönen, and two other teams. Double R Racing's lead driver, Mike Conway, dominated the championship. In the 2007 British F3 season, Mercedes powered the majority of the Championship field.

Factory drivers

Current

See also
 Silver Arrows
 Mercedes-Benz Grand Prix results
 Mercedes-AMG
 Mercedes AMG High Performance Powertrains

References

Notes

Bibliography

External links
 Official website 

German auto racing teams
German racecar constructors
Grand Prix teams
Mercedes-Benz in motorsport